Solar storms of different types are caused by disturbances on the Sun, most often from coronal mass ejections (CMEs) and solar flares from active regions, or, less often, from coronal holes. Minor to active solar storms (i.e. storming restricted to higher latitudes) may occur under elevated background solar wind conditions when the interplanetary magnetic field (IMF) orientation is southward, toward the Earth (which also leads to much stronger storming conditions from CME-related sources).

Background

Active stars produce disturbances in space weather and, if strong enough, in their own space climate. Science studies such phenomena with the field of heliophysics, which is an interdisciplinary combination of solar physics and planetary science.

In the Solar System, the Sun can produce intense geomagnetic and energetic particle storms capable of causing severe damage to technology. It can result in large scale power outages, disruption or blackouts of radio communications (including GPS), damage or destruction of submarine communications cables, and temporary to permanent disabling of satellites and other electronics. Intense solar storms may also be hazardous to high-latitude, high-altitude aviation and to human spaceflight. Geomagnetic storms are the cause of aurora. The most significant known solar storm, across the most parameters, occurred in September 1859 and is known as the "Carrington event". The damage from the most potent solar storms is capable of existentially threatening the stability of modern human civilization, although proper preparedness and mitigation can substantially reduce the hazards.

Proxy data from Earth, as well as analysis of stars similar to the Sun, suggest that the Sun may be also capable of producing so called superflares, which are as much as 1000x stronger than any flares in the historical record. Other research, like models of solar flares and statistics of extreme solar events reconstructed using cosmogenic isotope data in terrestrial archives, indicate otherwise. The discrepancy is not yet resolved and may be related to a biased statistic of the stellar population of solar analogs.

Coronal mass ejections and solar particle events

Events affecting Earth

Proxy evidence
This section contains a list of possible events that are indicated by indirect, or proxy data. The scientific value of such data remains unresolved. 

 7176 BCE Found in beryllium-10 (and other isotopes) spike in ice cores and corroborated by tree rings. It unexpectedly appears to have occurred near a Solar minimum and was as strong as, or probably even slightly stronger than the famous 774–775 CE event.
  5410 BCE
 5259 BCE Found in beryllium-10 spike in ice cores and corroborated by tree rings. At least as strong as the 774–775 event.
  660 BCE
 774–775 CE This extreme solar proton event is known as the Miyake event. It caused the largest and most rapid rise in carbon-14 levels ever recorded. 
 993–994 CE It caused a carbon-14 spike visible in tree rings which was used to date Viking archaeological remains in L’Anse aux Meadows in Newfoundland to 1021.
 1052 CE found in carbon-14 spike
 1279 CE found in carbon-14 spike

Direct measurements and/or visual observations

Events not affecting Earth
The above events affected Earth (and its vicinity, known as the magnetosphere), whereas the following events were directed elsewhere in the Solar System and were detected by monitoring spacecraft or other means.

Soft X-ray solar flares

Solar flares are intense localized eruptions of electromagnetic radiation in the Sun's atmosphere. They are often classified based on the peak flux of soft X-rays (SXR) measured by the GOES spacecraft in geosynchronous orbit (see ). 

The following table lists the largest flares in this respect since June 1996, the beginning of solar cycle 23.

See also

References

Further reading

External links
 The Most Powerful Solar Flares Ever Recorded (NASA's SpaceWeather.com)
 Solar Proton Events Affecting the Earth Environment (1976 - present) (SWPC)
 Archive of the most severe solar storms (Solarstorms.org)
 GOES X-ray Solar Imager Greatest Hits
 
 

Solar storm
Lists of natural disasters
Solar System-related lists